The 2010 Miami Dolphins season was the franchise's 41st season in the National Football League, the 45th overall and the third under head coach Tony Sparano. The Dolphins failed to improve upon their 7–9 record in 2009, and placed in third in the AFC East that year.

Offseason personnel moves

Staff Changes

In September 2010, Bill Parcells, stepped down as Vice President of Football Operations, but remaining as a consultant. He was later criticised for not making the right choices to improve the team.

The Dolphins lost their first coach of the offseason—outside linebackers coach Jim Reid—on January 8, when Reid was named defensive coordinator and associated head coach under Mike London at the University of Virginia.

That same week, inside linebackers coach George Edwards was named defensive coordinator at the University of Florida under Urban Meyer and acting head coach Steve Addazio. He would later go on to fill the Buffalo Bills' defensive coordinator position.
On January 11, the Dolphins fired defensive coordinator Paul Pasqualoni after the team finished 25th in the league in points allowed during the season. He was quickly replaced by former Denver Broncos defensive coordinator, Mike Nolan, less than 24 hours after resigning his post in Denver. Former New York Giants defensive coordinator Bill Sheridan was named linebackers coach to replace both Edwards and Reid.

Players

Re-signings
June 17 — Re-signed linebacker Tim Dobbins to a two-year extension.
June 18 — Re-signed punter Brandon Fields to a two-year extension, and signed long snapper John Denney to a three-year extension.
July 27 — Re-signed kicker Dan Carpenter to a three-year extension.
August 6 – Re-signed tight end David Martin. Martin had missed the entire 2009 season with a knee injury, and was released from the team in December.
August 16 – Re-signed defensive end/outside linebacker Ikaika Alama-Francis to a one-year extension.

Signings
March 5 – Signed linebacker Karlos Dansby (Arizona Cardinals).
March 17 – Signed guard Richie Incognito (Buffalo Bills).
May 20 – Signed linebacker Zach Thomas to a one-day contract (Kansas City Chiefs).
May 24 – Signed Offensive Lineman Cory Procter (Dallas Cowboys).
July 25 – Signed defensive tackle Montavious Stanley (Jacksonville Jaguars).
July 27 – Signed defensive end Marques Douglas (New York Jets).
July 30 – Signed defensive end Charles Grant (New Orleans Saints).
September 6 – Signed inside linebacker Bobby Carpenter (St. Louis Rams).
September 8 – Signed running back/kick returner Clifton Smith (Tampa Bay Buccaneers).
September 21 – Signed tight end Jeron Mastrud from the practice squad.

Departures

March 5 – Released linebackers Joey Porter, Akin Ayodele and safety Gibril Wilson.
May 20 – Announced the retirement of linebacker Zach Thomas.
May 27 – Terminated the contract of linebacker Reggie Torbor.
July 15 – Announced the retirement of defensive tackle Jason Ferguson.
September 4 – Released quarterback Pat White, guard Donald Thomas, tight end David Martin and wide receiver Patrick Turner among final roster cuts.
September 5 – Released defensive ends Marques Douglas and Charles Grant.
September 6 – Terminated the contract of outside linebacker Charlie Anderson.
September 8 – Terminated the contract of center Jake Grove.

Trades
April 14 – Traded a 2nd round selection in the 2010 NFL Draft (43rd overall, traded to Baltimore – Sergio Kindle) and the 2011 NFL Draft for Denver Broncos wide receiver Brandon Marshall.
April 16 – Traded wide receiver Ted Ginn Jr. to the San Francisco 49ers for a fifth round selection in the 2010 NFL Draft (145th overall – Nolan Carroll).
April 22 – Traded the 12th overall selection (Ryan Mathews), a 4th round selection (110th overall, Darrell Stuckey), and a 6th round selection (173rd overall, traded to San Francisco – Anthony Dixon) in the 2010 NFL Draft to the San Diego Chargers for the 28th overall selection (Jared Odrick), a 2nd round selection (40th overall, Koa Misi), a 4th round selection (126th overall, traded to Dallas – Akwasi Owusu-Ansah) and linebacker Tim Dobbins.
May 24 – Traded guard Justin Smiley to the Jacksonville Jaguars for a 7th round selection in the 2011 NFL Draft.
August 25 – Traded wide receiver Greg Camarillo to the Minnesota Vikings for cornerback Benny Sapp.
September 3 – Acquired offensive tackle Pat McQuistan from the Dallas Cowboys for a conditional 7th-round draft choice in the 2011 NFL Draft.

2010 NFL Draft

After finishing the 2009 season with a record of 7–9, the Dolphins were slotted for the 12th overall pick in the draft. However, on draft day, they ended up trading down with San Diego for the No.28 pick.

Notes
Miami traded their 2010 first-round pick (12th overall), a fourth-round selection (110th overall), and a sixth-round selection it acquired from Kansas City (173rd overall) to San Diego for a first-round selection (28th overall), a second-round selection it acquired from Seattle (40th overall), a fourth-round selection (126th overall), and linebacker Tim Dobbins.
Miami traded their second-round pick  (43rd overall) and its 2011 second-round selection to Denver for wide receiver Brandon Marshall.
Miami traded their fifth-round pick (142d overall) to Kansas City for quarterback Tyler Thigpen.
San Francisco traded their fifth-round pick (145th overall) to Miami for wide receiver Ted Ginn Jr.
Kansas City traded their sixth-round pick (173rd overall) to Miami for offensive linemen Andy Alleman and Ikechuku Ndukwe.
Washington traded their sixth-round pick (174rd overall) and a 2009 second-round selection (44th overall) to Miami for defensive end Jason Taylor.
Kansas City traded their seventh-round pick (212nd) to Miami for a 2009 seventh-round selection (237th overall).
Seventh-round pick (252nd overall) is a compensatory pick.
Washington traded their fifth-round pick (163rd overall) to Miami for a sixth-round selection (174th overall) and a seventh-round selection (219th overall).

Staff

Team Captains

Yeremiah Bell, Patrick Cobbs, Karlos Dansby, and Jake Long.

Roster

Schedule

Preseason
The Dolphins preseason schedule was announced on March 31, 2010.

Regular season
The 2010 regular season schedule was announced on April 20, 2010.

Standings

Conference

Game results

Week 1: at Buffalo Bills

The Miami Dolphins began their season at Ralph Wilson Stadium for an AFC East duel with the Buffalo Bills. In the first quarter, Miami struck first when kicker Dan Carpenter nailed a 32-yard field goal, which was increased in the second quarter when running back Ronnie Brown got a 1-yard TD run. The Bills replied when kicker Rian Lindell made a 51-yard field goal.
In the fourth quarter, Miami scored first with Carpenter hitting a 43-yard field goal. Then, the Bills replied with quarterback Trent Edwards making a 31-yard touchdown pass to wide receiver Roscoe Parrish. The final score was made when long snapper Garrison Sanborn fumbled out of bounds for a safety.

With the win, the Dolphins began the season at 1–0.

Week 2: at Minnesota Vikings

Hoping to increase their winning streak, the Dolphins flew to Mall of America Field at Hubert H. Humphrey Metrodome for an interconference duel with the Vikings. In the first quarter, the Dolphins got the early lead as QB Chad Henne made a 5-yard TD pass to WR Brian Hartline. In the third quarter, the Dolphins increased their lead when LB Koa Misi recovered a fumble in the endzone for a touchdown, but Minnesota scored with RB Adrian Peterson completing a 1-yard TD run. The Vikings tried to fight back in the 4th quarter with kicker Ryan Longwell nailing a 28-yard field goal, but Miami's defense prevented anything else from happening, giving Miami a win. It was the Dolphins' first road win over the Vikings since 1979.

With the win, Miami improved to 2–0.

Week 3: vs. New York Jets

Coming off their win over the Vikings, the Dolphins went home, donned their alternate uniforms, and played their Week 3 home-opener against their AFC East foe, the New York Jets, on Sunday night.  Miami trailed early in the first quarter as Jets quarterback Mark Sanchez completed a 24-yard touchdown pass to tight end Dustin Keller.  The Dolphins' deficit would increase in the second quarter as Sanchez hooked up with Keller again on a 3-yard touchdown pass.  Miami would respond with quarterback Chad Henne completing a 3-yard touchdown pass to tight end Anthony Fasano, followed by kicker Dan Carpenter making a 44-yard field goal.

The Dolphins would take the lead in the third quarter as Henne connected with wide receiver Brandon Marshall on an 11-yard touchdown pass, but New York would immediately respond as Sanchez found wide receiver Braylon Edwards on a 67-yard touchdown pass.  Miami would answer with Carpenter's 20-yard field goal.  In the fourth quarter, the Jets would add onto their lead as kicker Nick Folk got a 30-yard field goal.  The Dolphins would chip away as their deficit as Carpenter booted a 50-yard field goal, but New York would pull away as running back LaDainian Tomlinson got a 1-yard touchdown run.  Miami tried to rally, but the Jets' defense held on for the win.

With the loss, the Dolphins fell to 2–1.

Week 4: vs. New England Patriots

Hoping to rebound from their divisional loss to the Jets, the Dolphins stayed at home for a Week 4 AFC East duel with the New England Patriots on Monday night.  Miami delivered the opening punch in the first quarter as quarterback Chad Henne hooked up with wide receiver Davone Bess on a 19-yard touchdown pass.  In the second quarter, the Patriots answered with kicker Stephen Gostkowski making a 23-yard and a 30-yard field goal.

New England took the lead in the third quarter as wide receiver Brandon Tate returned the second half's opening kickoff 103 yards for a touchdown, followed by running back BenJarvis Green-Ellis' 12-yard touchdown run.  The Dolphins responded with Henne completing a 28-yard touchdown pass to running back Ricky Williams, but the Patriots came right back with quarterback Tom Brady's 11-yard touchdown pass to wide receiver Danny Woodhead.  New England would continue its dominance on special teams in the fourth quarter as cornerback Kyle Arrington returned a blocked field goal 35 yards for a touchdown.  Afterwards, the Patriots sealed the win as safety Patrick Chung returned an interception 51 yards for a touchdown.

With the loss, Miami went into its bye week at 2–2.

Week 6: at Green Bay Packers

Coming off their bye week the Dolphins flew to Lambeau field for an Interconference duel against the Packers. In the first quarter the Dolphins trailed early with kicker Mason Crosby nailing a 46-yard field goal. But they replied with QB Chad Henne making a 2-yard TD pass to WR Davone Bess. The lead didn't last very long after QB Aaron Rodgers made an 86-yard TD pass to WR Greg Jennings. The Dolphins tied the game in the second quarter with kicker Dan Carpenter hitting a 53-yard field goal. He also made a 41-yard field goal to put the Dolphins up 13–10. In the fourth quarter the Packers tied the game with Crosby making a 46-yard field goal, but the Dolphins got the lead back when Henne found TE Anthony Fasano on a 22-yard TD pass. Green Bay replied with Rodgers scrambling 1 yard to the endzone for a touchdown to put the game in overtime. After overtime, the decision was made when Carpenter successfully put away a 44-yard field goal to give the Dolphins the win.

With the win, the Dolphins improved to 3–2.

Week 7: vs. Pittsburgh Steelers

Coming off their road win over the Packers, the Dolphins went home for a Week 7 intraconference duel with the Pittsburgh Steelers.  The Dolphins delivered the opening splash in the first quarter with a 39-yard and a 23-yard field goal from kicker Dan Carpenter.  In the second quarter, the Steelers took the lead with kicker Jeff Reed getting a 22-yard field goal, followed by quarterback Ben Roethlisberger completing a 21-yard touchdown pass to wide receiver Hines Ward.  Miami would respond with Carpenter's 22-yard field goal, but Pittsburgh struck back with Roethlisberger's 53-yard touchdown pass to wide receiver Mike Wallace.  The Dolphins would close out the half as quarterback Chad Henne found wide receiver Davone Bess on a 25-yard touchdown pass.

The Steelers added onto their lead in the third quarter as Reed got a 39-yard field goal.  Miami would answer with Carpenter's 37-yard field goal.  The Dolphins regained the lead in the fourth quarter as Carpenter booted a 40-yard field goal, but Pittsburgh answered with Reed making an 18-yard field goal.  The Dolphins tried to rally, but the Steelers' defense held on for the win.

With the loss, Miami fell to 3–3.

Week 8: at Cincinnati Bengals

Hoping to rebound from their loss to the Steelers the Dolphins flew to Paul Brown Stadium for an AFC duel with the Bengals. In the first quarter the Dolphins trailed early as QB Carson Palmer got a 7-yard TD pass to WR Terrell Owens. They soon replied with kicker Dan Carpenter hitting a 38- and a 42-yard field goal. The Dolphins fell further behind with Palmer finding Owens again on a 37-yard TD pass. The Dolphins caught up and eventually took the lead with Carpenter hitting a 24, 54, and a 31-yard field goal in the third quarter to put the Dolphins up 15–14. They increased their lead with RB Ricky Williams making a 1-yard TD run.

With the win, the Dolphins improved to 4–3.

Week 9: at Baltimore Ravens

The Dolphins' eighth game was an AFC duel with the Ravens. The Dolphins trailed early after QB Joe Flacco completed a 32-yard TD pass to RB Willis McGahee. They replied with RB Ronnie Brown getting a 12-yard TD run. The Ravens got the lead back after kicker Billy Cundiff made a 26 and a 39-yard field goal. The Dolphins narrowed the lead with kicker Dan Carpenter nailing a 19-yard field goal. The Dolphins fell further behind after Flacco found WR Derrick Mason on a 12-yard TD pass. This was followed in the 4th quarter by Cundiff hitting a 20 and a 24-yard field goal.

With the loss, Miami fell to 4–4.

Week 10: vs. Tennessee Titans

Hoping to rebound from their loss to the Ravens the Dolphins played on home ground for an AFC duel with the Titans. In the first quarter the Dolphins took the lead as RB Ronnie Brown got a 2-yard TD run. The Titans replied with RB Chris Johnson getting a 17-yard TD run. They fell behind after kicker Rob Bironas nailed a 40-yard field goal. They eventually took the lead after kicker Dan Carpenter made a 23 and a 26-yard field goal, which was soon followed by QB Chad Henne completing a 13-yard TD pass to RB Patrick Cobbs. The Titans replied with QB Vince Young completing a 14-yard TD pass to WR Nate Washington, but the Dolphins continued to score after Carpenter got a 42-yard field goal, followed by QB Tyler Thigpen making a 9-yard TD pass to TE Anthony Fasano (With a failed 2-point conversion). Then FS Reshad Jones intercepted a pass in the end zone for a touchback.

With the win, the Dolphins improved to 5–4.

Week 11: vs. Chicago Bears

Coming off their win over the Titans, the Dolphins stayed at home for a Week 11 interconference duel with the Chicago Bears on Thursday night.  Miami trailed early in the first quarter as Bears kicker Robbie Gould got a 46-yard field goal.  Chicago added onto their lead in the second quarter with Gould making a 24-yard field goal.

The Bears continued to increase their lead with Gould's 50-yard field goal, followed by a touchdown scored by running back Matt Forté. This was the final score of the game, with Chicago's defense preventing any score by the Dolphins.

With the loss, the Dolphins fell to 5–5.

Week 12: at Oakland Raiders

The Dolphins' eleventh game was an AFC duel with the Raiders. In the first quarter the Dolphins trailed immediately as Jacoby Ford returned a kick-off 101 yards  to their own endzone for a touchdown. They overcame this deficit with kicker Dan Carpenter nailing a 49-yard field goal, followed by QB Chad Henne completing a 29-yard TD pass to RB Patrick Cobbs. The Raiders replied as QB Bruce Gradkowski made a 44-yard TD pass to Ford. The Dolphins got the lead back as Carpenter got a 23-yard field goal, followed by Henne getting a 57-yard TD pass to WR Marlon Moore, and with Carpenter nailing a 44-yard field goal. The lead was narrowed when kicker Sebastian Janikowski hit a 30-yard field goal, but the Dolphins pulled away with Carpenter getting a 25-yard field goal, and with RB Ricky Williams getting a 45-yard TD run.

With the win, Miami improved to 6–5.

Week 13: vs. Cleveland Browns

Coming off their win over the Raiders the Dolphins played on home ground for an AFC duel with the Browns. The second quarter saw the Dolphins trailing early as kicker Phil Dawson made a 32-yard field goal. They replied with kicker Dan Carpenter hitting a 60-yard field goal. They trailed again with QB Jake Delhomme completing a 3-yard TD pass to TE Benjamin Watson. But they replied in the fourth quarter with QB Chad Henne making an 11-yard TD pass to TE Anthony Fasano. The Browns scored again after Dawson nailed a 23-yard field goal.

With the loss, Miami fell to 6–6.

Week 14: at New York Jets

Hoping to rebound from their loss to the Browns the Dolphins flew to New Meadowlands Stadium for an AFC East rivalry match against the Jets. The Dolphins took the lead with kicker Dan Carpenter nailing a 47-yard field goal, followed by QB Chad Henne completing a 6-yard TD pass to WR Brandon Marshall. The Jets responded with kicker Nick Folk hitting a 35 and a 42-yard field goal.

With the win, Miami improved to 7–6.

Week 15: vs. Buffalo Bills

The Dolphins' fourteenth game was a must-win matchup against the Buffalo Bills. The Dolphins lost. The final score was seventeen (17) to fourteen (14) and the Dolphins never lead during the game.
The second quarter saw Miami trailing early with QB Ryan Fitzpatrick completing an 18-yard TD pass to WR David Nelson. This was followed by kicker Rian Lindell nailing a 29-yard field goal. The Dolphins responded with RB Ronnie Brown getting a 6-yard TD run, but trailed further in the third quarter with Fitzpatrick throwing a 15-yard TD pass to WR Stevie Johnson. The Dolphins tried to cut the lead with QB Chad Henne getting a 9-yard TD pass to WR Brandon Marshall, but the Bills defense denied any more offensive chances.

With the loss, Miami fell to 7–7, and was officially eliminated from playoff contention.  Reaction around the Miami area was palpable, with many fans and the media calling for head coach Tony Sparano to resign at the end of the season.

Week 16: vs. Detroit Lions

The Dolphins fifteenth game was an inter-conference duel against the Lions. The Dolphins trailed early as kicker Dave Rayner nailed a 39-yard field goal. They re-tied the game with kicker Dan Carpenter hit a 40-yard field goal. The Lions scored again with QB Shaun Hill completing a 20-yard TD pass to TE Brandon Pettigrew, but the Dolphins got the lead back with FB Lousaka Polite getting a 4-yard TD run, followed by QB Chad Henne getting a 13-yard TD pass to WR Davone Bess. The Lions tied the game with RB Maurice Morris getting a 5-yard TD run, but the Dolphins scored to take the lead again with RB Ronnie Brown getting a 1-yard TD run, followed by Carpenter hitting a 28-yard field goal. They failed to maintain this lead after QB Shaun Hill completed a 53-yard TD pass to RB Jahvid Best, followed by Rayner making a 47-yard field goal, then with MLB DeAndre Levy returning an interception 30 yards for a touchdown.

With the loss, Miami fell to 7–8.

Week 17: at New England Patriots

The Dolphins' final game was an AFC East rematch against the Patriots. They trailed early with QB Tom Brady throwing a 13-yard TD pass to WR Rob Gronkowski, followed by BenJarvus Green-Ellis getting a 1-yard TD run, then with kicker Shayne Graham nailing a 28-yard field goal. The Dolphins continued to struggle after a three-and-out was converted into a 94-yard punt return for a touchdown by Julian Edelman, followed by Brady making a 10-yard TD pass to TE Alge Crumpler, then with QB Brian Hoyer completing a 42-yard TD pass to WR Brandon Tate. The Dolphins made their only score of the game with QB Tyler Thigpen throwing a 21-yard TD pass to WR Davone Bess.

With the loss, Miami finished their season with a 7–9 record.

References

External links
 Official Website

Miami
Miami Dolphins seasons